Sergey Nikiforov (born 15 May 1966) is a Soviet former skier. He competed in the Nordic combined event at the 1988 Winter Olympics.

References

External links
 

1966 births
Living people
Soviet male Nordic combined skiers
Olympic Nordic combined skiers of the Soviet Union
Nordic combined skiers at the 1988 Winter Olympics
Skiers from Moscow